Brigid Jepchirchir Kosgei (born 20 February 1994) is a Kenyan long-distance runner who specialises in the marathon. She won the 2018 and 2019 Chicago Marathons, the 2019 and 2020 London Marathons and the 2021 Tokyo Marathon. Kosgei is the current marathon world record holder for women running in a mixed-sex race, with a time of 2:14:04 achieved on 13 October 2019 at the Chicago Marathon. She won the silver medal in the marathon event at the 2020 Tokyo Olympics.

Personal life
Brigid Jepchirchir Kosgei grew up in Elgeyo-Marakwet County, Kenya, and had six siblings. Aged 17, she began running training with her boyfriend and now husband Matthew Kosgei.

Career
Kosgei finished in the top two in eight of the first nine marathons that she ran. She came second at the 2016 Lisbon Marathon behind Sarah Chepchirchir, in a personal best time of 2:24:45. Her time was faster than the previous course record. In 2017, Kosgei won the Bogotá Half Marathon, and came third at the Copenhagen Half Marathon. She came second in the 2017 Chicago Marathon in a personal best time of 2:20:22. Her time was the sixth-fastest ever time at the Chicago Marathon. Weeks later, she won the Honolulu Marathon, beating the course record by over five minutes. In 2018, Kosgei came second in the London Marathon behind Vivian Cheruiyot. After injuring herself during the Bogotá Marathon, Kosgei decided to run the Great North Run, in order to practice ahead of the 2018 Chicago Marathon. She finished the event second, behind Cheruiyot. Kosgei later won the Chicago Marathon, after breaking away from a group of two other Kenyans and three Ethiopians after  of the race. She set a personal best time of 2:18:35. During 2018, Kosgei also won a cross country event in Eldoret, Kenya, and the Kalya Half Marathon in Kapenguria, Kenya.

Kosgei won the 2019 London Marathon, becoming the youngest woman to win the event. This was the third-best time in London after Paula Radcliffe in 2005 with 2:17:42 and Mary Keitany 2017 with the world record 2:17:01. At the 2019 Great North Run, Kosgei won in a course-record time of 1:04.28, 23 seconds faster than the previous half marathon world record set by Joyciline Jepkosgei.

She won the 2019 Chicago Marathon on 13 October 2019 in a world record time of 2:14:04, an improvement of her personal best by more than 4 minutes. She beat the previous world record by 81 seconds, and was over six minutes ahead of second place Ababel Yeshaneh. Kosgei wore specially adapted Nike shoes, which have been alleged to have given her a 60–90 second advantage. Later in the year, she won the 15 km Saint Silvester Road Race in a time of 48:54.

In February 2020, Kosgei finished second to Yeshaneh at the Ras Al Khaimah Half Marathon. Kosgei's time of 1:04:49 was two seconds better than the previous world record. Kosgei and Yeshaneh's time of 30:18 after  of the race was only one second slower than the best time set in a track 10,000m event in 2019. Later in the year, Kosgei won the rescheduled 2020 London Marathon by over three minutes. Kosgei broke away from the pack  into the race, and stayed ahead for the rest of the race. She finished in a time of 2:18.58.

Before its postponement, Kosgei was chosen to lead the Kenyan women's marathon squad for the 2020 Summer Olympics in Tokyo, Japan. The other athletes chosen in the squad were Cheruiyot and Ruth Chepng'etich. In February 2021, Kosgei was confirmed in the Kenyan marathon team for the rescheduled 2020 Summer Olympics, alongside Cheruiyot, Chepng'etich and Peres Jepchirchir. It was Kosgei's first appearance at the Olympics. She finished second behind Jepchirchir. Later in the year, she came fourth at the 2021 London Marathon. In March 2022, Kosgei won the delayed 2021 Tokyo Marathon in a time of 2:16:20, the third fastest ever time.

Achievements
All information from World Athletics profile unless otherwise noted.

Marathon competition record

Personal bests

References

External links

 

1994 births
Living people
Kenyan female marathon runners
Chicago Marathon female winners
People from Elgeyo-Marakwet County
London Marathon female winners
World Athletics record holders
Athletes (track and field) at the 2020 Summer Olympics
Medalists at the 2020 Summer Olympics
Olympic silver medalists for Kenya
Olympic silver medalists in athletics (track and field)
Olympic athletes of Kenya
Tokyo Marathon female winners